Sopot Kamienny Potok railway station is a railway station serving the city of Sopot, in the Pomeranian Voivodeship, Poland. The station opened in 1950 and is located on the Gdańsk Śródmieście–Rumia railway. The train services are operated by SKM Tricity.

Train services
The station is served by the following service(s):

Szybka Kolej Miejska services (SKM) (Lębork -) Wejherowo - Reda - Rumia - Gdynia - Sopot - Gdansk

References

 This article is based upon a translation of the Polish language version as of November 2016.

External links

Railway stations in Poland opened in 1950
Railway stations served by Szybka Kolej Miejska (Tricity)
Kamienny Potok